Ischnophanes excentra is a moth of the family Coleophoridae. It is found in Spain.

References

Coleophoridae
Moths described in 2003